The 1972–73 South Pacific cyclone season ran year-round from July 1 to June 30. Tropical cyclone activity in the Southern Hemisphere reaches its peak from mid-February to early March.

Seasonal summary

Systems

Severe Tropical Cyclone Bebe 

Tropical Cyclone Bebe was a pre-season storm that impacted the Gilbert, Ellice, and Fiji island groups. First spotted on October 20, the system intensified and grew in size through October 22. Its course began along a south-southwest trajectory before recurving near the 14th parallel south, which resulted in a south-southeast motion through the western portion of the Fiji island group. It became the first cyclone to impact Fiji since 1952. Cyclone Bebe passed through Funafuti on Saturday 21st and Sunday 22 October 1972. At about 4 p.m. on the 21st, sea water was bubbling through the coral on the airfield with the water reaching a height of about 4 –5 feet high. The Ellice Islands Colony's ship Moanaraoi was in the lagoon and survived, however 3 tuna boats were wrecked. Waves broke over the atoll. Five people died, two adults and a 3 month old child were swept away by waves, and two sailors from the tuna boats were drowned. Cyclone Bebe knocked down 90% of the houses and trees. The storm surge created a wall of coral rubble along the ocean side of Funafuti and Funafala that was about ten to twelve miles long, and about ten to twenty feet thick at the bottom. The cyclone submerged Funafuti and sources of drinking water were contaminated as a result of the system's storm surge and fresh water flooding. After passing by the archipelago, Bebe transitioned into an extratropical cyclone, with the remnants last noted on October 28. A total of 28 people died and thousands were left homeless. Damages totaled $20 million (1972 USD).

Tropical Cyclone Collette 

Collette existed from November 2 to November 3.

Severe Tropical Cyclone Diana 

Diana existed from December 6 to December 18.

Tropical Cyclone Felicity 

Felicity existed from January 14 to January 18.

Tropical Cyclone Elenore 

Elenore existed from January 31 to February 7.

Tropical Cyclone Glenda 

Glenda existed from January 31 to February 1.

Tropical Cyclone Henrietta

Tropical Cyclone Juliette 

Juliette existed from April 2 to April 6.

Seasonal effects 

|-
| Bebe ||  || bgcolor=#| || bgcolor=#| || bgcolor=#| || Tuvalu, Fiji || || ||
|-
| Collette ||  || bgcolor=#|Category 1 tropical cyclone || bgcolor=#| || bgcolor=#| || || || ||
|-
| Diana ||  || bgcolor=#| || bgcolor=#| || bgcolor=#| || || || ||
|-
| Felicity ||  || bgcolor=#|Category 1 tropical cyclone || bgcolor=#| || bgcolor=#| || || || ||
|-
| Elenore ||  || bgcolor=#|Category 2 tropical cyclone || bgcolor=#| || bgcolor=#| || Fiji, Tonga || || ||
|-
| Glenda ||  || bgcolor=#|Category 1 tropical cyclone || bgcolor=#| || bgcolor=#| || || || ||
|-
| Henrietta ||  || bgcolor=#|Category 1 tropical cyclone || bgcolor=#| || bgcolor=#| || || || ||
|-
| Juliette ||  || bgcolor=#|Category 2 tropical cyclone || bgcolor=#| || bgcolor=#| || Fiji, Tonga || || ||
|-

See also 

 Atlantic hurricane seasons: 1972, 1973
 Eastern Pacific hurricane seasons: 1972, 1973
 Western Pacific typhoon seasons: 1972, 1973
 North Indian Ocean cyclone seasons: 1972, 1973

References

External links 

 
South Pacific cyclone seasons
Articles which contain graphical timelines